"Sergeant Prishibeyev" is an 1885 short story by Anton Chekhov.

Publication
The story was first published in the 18 (5 o.s.) October 1885, No. 273 issue of Peterburgskaya Gazeta originally under the title "Muckrake" (Кляузник), and signed A. Chekhonte (А. Чехонте). Under the new title it was included by Chekhov into Volume 2 of his Collected Works published in 1899–1901 by Adolf Marks.

Background 
Sergeant Prishibeyev was written originally for the Oskolki magazine, but its editor Nikolai Leykin found it 'too dry' and 'overdrawn'. Leykin prepared his own, abridged version of the story, but even that one was rejected by the censor Svyatkovsky. Following Leykin's advice, Chekhov sent it to the St Petersburg Gazette where it had no problems with censorship and was published as "Muckrake".

Synopsis
Sergeant Prishibeyev gets himself into trouble with the police, due to his old army habit of restoring what he perceives as 'order', wherever he happens to be.

Notes

References

External links
 Унтер Пришибеев. Original Russian text
 Sergeant Prishibeyev, the English translation by Constance Garnett

Short stories by Anton Chekhov
1885 short stories
Works originally published in Russian newspapers